Samuel Powell-Pepper (born 8 January 1998) is a professional Australian rules footballer playing for the Port Adelaide Football Club in the Australian Football League (AFL).

Early life
Powell-Pepper was born in Perth, the son of Maureen and Steven. His mother is Aboriginal and Torres Strait Islander and his father is white. He has two full siblings and two half-brothers. His parents separated when he was young and he lived with his father until he was eight, then spent periods with his paternal grandmother, his mother, and friends' families. His maternal grandmother died in prison and his mother has also spent time in prison.

Powell-Pepper initially attended Mount Lawley Senior High School as an inaugural member of the school’s Aboriginal Excellence Program, before switching to Wesley College on an indigenous scholarship. He went to school with Quinton Narkle who is his second cousin. He played junior football for the Mt Hawthorn Cardinals.

In 2016, Powell-Pepper made his senior debut for the East Perth Football Club during round 20 of the 2016 WAFL season going on to play all the remaining games for the year.

AFL career
Powell-Pepper was drafted by the Port Adelaide Football Club with their second selection and eighteenth overall in the 2016 national draft. He made his AFL debut in Port Adelaide's twenty-eight point win against  in the opening round of the 2017 season at the Sydney Cricket Ground. He was named that round's AFL Rising Star nominee after kicking two goals in the match, the first with his first kick in AFL football. In a game against Melbourne, he recorded 17 tackles, beating the club's previous record which was 16.

Statistics
Statistics are correct to the end of Round 23, 2021

|- style="background-color: #EAEAEA"
! scope="row" style="text-align:center" | 2017
|  || 2 || 22 || 16 || 14 || 182 || 193 || 375 || 57 || 114 || 0.7 || 0.6 || 8.3 || 8.8 || 17.0 || 2.6 || 5.2
|-
! scope="row" | 
|  || 2 || 16 || 5 || 13 || 137 || 168 || 305 || 36 || 97 || 0.3 || 0.8 || 8.6 || 10.5 || 19.1 || 2.2 || 6.1 
|-
|- style="background-color: #EAEAEA"
! scope="row" style="text-align:center" | 2019
|  || 2 || 19 || 10 || 18 || 187 || 171 || 358 || 50 || 92 || 0.5 || 0.9 || 9.8 || 9.0 || 18.8 || 2.6 || 4.8
|-
! scope="row" style="text-align:center" | 2020
|  
|| 2 || 19 || 7 || 12 || 123 || 157 || 280 || 36 || 77 || 0.4 || 0.6 || 6.5 || 8.7 || 14.7 || 1.9 || 4.0 
|-
|- style="background-color: #EAEAEA"
! scope="row" | 
|  || 2 || 14 || 8 || 7 || 110 || 97 || 207 || 37 || 60 || 0.6 || 0.5 || 7.9 || 6.9 || 14.8 || 2.6 || 4.3 
|-|- class="sortbottom"
! colspan=3| Career
! 90
! 46
! 64
! 739
! 786
! 1525
! 216
! 440
! 0.5
! 0.7
! 8.2
! 8.7
! 16.9
! 2.4
! 4.9
|}

Notes

References

External links

1998 births
Living people
Port Adelaide Football Club players
Port Adelaide Football Club players (all competitions)
East Perth Football Club players
Australian rules footballers from Western Australia
Indigenous Australian players of Australian rules football
People educated at Mount Lawley Senior High School
People educated at Wesley College, Perth
Torres Strait Islanders
Australian people of English descent